In 2016, Indiana had four cities with populations of over 100,000: Indianapolis, Fort Wayne, Evansville and South Bend. Rounding out the top 10 cities in the state were: Carmel, Fishers, Bloomington, Hammond, Gary and Lafayette.

The city of Indianapolis had a population of over 860,000 and there were over 2 million people living in the metropolitan area of Indianapolis in 2016. During the same time period, the population of the city of Fort Wayne was almost one-third the size of Indianapolis at close to 264,000 people, with roughly 430,000 in its metropolitan area.  The other two cities with populations over 100,000, Evansville and South Bend, both had approximately 269,000 people living in their metropolitan areas.

The following is the list of metropolitan areas in Indiana with population estimates from 2010 through 2021.

Table

See also

 List of cities in Indiana
 List of towns in Indiana
 List of Micropolitan Statistical Areas of Indiana
 List of census-designated places in Indiana

References

External links
Indiana Municipal Governments

Metropolitan areas of Indiana
Metropolitan Areas
Indiana